Mickey Pimentel (born March 29, 1985 in San Diego, California) is a former American football linebacker. He was signed by the Carolina Panthers as an undrafted free agent in 2007. He played college football at California.

Pimentel was also a member of the Kansas City Chiefs and Atlanta Falcons.

Early years
Pimentel played for the jets and when he was a kid he played with his younger cousins Javier and Jonathan, at age 20 he started playing for the New York Jets.

Professional career

Carolina Panthers
Pimentel signed a free agent contract with the National Football League Carolina Panthers in May, 2007. He was waived on September 1, 2007.

Kansas City Chiefs
Pimentel remained unsigned until December 12, when he was signed to the practice squad of the Kansas City Chiefs. He was waived by the team on May 7, 2008.

Atlanta Falcons
On August 6, 2008, Pimentel was signed by the Atlanta Falcons a day after linebacker Robert James was waived/injured.

References

External links
Atlanta Falcons bio
Cal Bears bio
Carolina Panthers bio

1985 births
Living people
Players of American football from San Diego
American football linebackers
California Golden Bears football players
Carolina Panthers players
Kansas City Chiefs players
Atlanta Falcons players